Yousra Abdel Razek (born December 3, 1995, in Cairo, also known as Yousra Helmy) is an Egyptian table tennis player. She competed at the 2016 Summer Olympics as part of the Egyptian team in the women's team event. The team lost to Singapore in the first round.

She qualified to represent Egypt at the 2020 Summer Olympics where she played in 2 events, singles and women's teams.

She is the daughter of Olympic table tennis players Ashraf Helmy and Nihal Meshref.

References

1995 births
Living people
Egyptian female table tennis players
Olympic table tennis players of Egypt
Table tennis players at the 2016 Summer Olympics
Competitors at the 2019 African Games
African Games gold medalists for Egypt
African Games bronze medalists for Egypt
African Games medalists in table tennis
Table tennis players at the 2020 Summer Olympics
21st-century Egyptian women